The Dundee derby is a football match between Dundee and Dundee United. The clubs are based yards apart in the city of Dundee, the fourth-largest city in Scotland.

History

Dundee is the older of the two, having been founded in 1893, compared to Dundee United which was founded in 1909 as Dundee Hibernian following the demise of Dundee Harp, a club founded by Irish immigrants in 1879. While United's origins stem from Irish immigration, the rivalry is not sectarian in the manner of the Old Firm.

Dundee had long been the more successful club, playing more seasons in the top flight than their rivals and winning one League title, one Scottish Cup and three League Cups before United lifted a major trophy. However, from the 1970s under Jim McLean the tide turned in the city's footballing rivalry. United would go on to be a major force in Scottish football in the 1980s, winning their first three major honours at Dens Park including a League Cup win against Dundee in 1980; the 1983 league title was also won there. Their rivalry with Aberdeen, who also lifted several trophies during the period, was entitled the New Firm. In 1994 United won their first Scottish Cup, and their second in 2010, in doing so drawing level with Dundee on five major trophies won.

 
The two grounds are the closest League grounds in Britain and with it a unique rivalry has developed, though one often deemed more amicable than most, similar to the Merseyside derby, Derby della Madonnina in Milan, and the Derby della Lanterna of Genoa with many families split down the middle in support.

The two clubs even had a combined hooligan 'firm', known as the Dundee Utility, which was formed to stand up to the larger firms of the Glasgow and Edinburgh clubs.

Statistics

Domestic head-to-head

In domestic head-to-head matches, United are quite far in front; the teams have played each other 172 times, Dundee United winning 81 compared to Dundee's 49. A total of 42 matches have ended in a stalemate. Dundee United have won more league, Scottish Cup and League Cup matches.

League competition

Dundee have competed in more seasons of top flight football with 98 in total to United's 61, but United have maintained a better points to game average in the top tier. Both clubs have won the Scottish league championship once, Dundee in 1962 and United in 1983. The clubs also sometimes meet in league games outside the top tier, as in 1995–96 and 2019–20.

All-time top flight table (1890/91-present – 126th Season)

As of 15 May 2022:

Scottish Premiership Table (2013/14–present – 10th Season)

As of 15 May 2022:

SPL Table (1998/99-2012/13 – 15 Seasons)

Premier Division Table (1975/76-1997/98 – 23 Seasons)

Division One table (1890/91-1974/75 – 78 Seasons)

Cup competition

Scottish Cup (1873/74-present – 136th Season)
In the Scottish Cup, Dundee have competed in 108 tournaments, reaching 5 cup finals. They were cup winners in 1910 as well as runners-up in 1925, 1952, 1964 and 2003. Dundee United have competed in 88 tournaments, reaching twice as many cup finals as Dundee. They were cup winners in 1994 and 2010 as well as runners up in 1974, 1981, 1985, 1987, 1988, 1991 (being unable to secure that trophy in six finals under otherwise successful boss Jim McLean), 2005 and 2014.

As of 4 July 2022:

League Cup (1946/47-present – 77th Season)
In the League Cup, Dundee have been the winners on three occasions, in 1951–52, 1952–53 and 1973–74, they were also runners-up in 1967–68, 1980–81 and 1995–96. Dundee United meanwhile have won it twice, in 1979–80 and 1980–81, and were runners-up in 1981–82, 1984–85, 1997–98, 2007–08, and 2014–15 (losing to either Rangers or Celtic on every occasion).

As of 23 September 2021:

European competition
In European competition, Dundee United have played in more tournaments and in more games, competing in 27 tournaments to Dundee's 7, and playing in 80 more matches. Neither side has won a trophy, although United were runners-up in the 1986–87 UEFA Cup; both sides have reached the semi-finals of the European Cup once, while Dundee also reached the semi-finals of the 1967–68 Inter-Cities Fairs Cup. Conversely, United hold the joint-record for worst result by a Scottish side, suffering a 7–0 defeat to Dutch side AZ Alkmaar on 11 August 2022.

As of 11 August 2022:

Trophy cabinet comparison
Both clubs have won 5 major Scottish football trophies.

Team records

The following are records just for the Dundee derby itself:
 The longest unbeaten run in all matches is 13, held by United, this was between December 1979 and September 1983, 11 of these were Wins.
 The longest unbeaten run in home matches is held by Dundee when United failed to beat them for 14 games between November 1925 and August 1962.
 The longest unbeaten run in away matches is held by United with a 12 match run at Dens Park between April 1963 and April 1971 which included 8 victories.
 The longest unbroken winning run in all matches belongs to United with 7 between March 1988 and April 1989.
 The longest unbroken winning run at home belongs to United with 6 between September 1974 and September 1981.
 The longest unbroken winning run away from home belongs to United who scored 8 consecutive victories at Dens Park between December 1980 and November 1984.
 The record home victory in a league match is 5–0 recorded by Dundee at Dens Park in August 1926
 The record away victory in a league match is 5–0 recorded by United at Dens Park in September 1965.
 The highest scoring match was in September 1971 when Dundee won 6–4 at Dens Park.
 Paul Sturrock of United holds the mark for the most derby goals with 14, 2 of these came in United's 3–0 League Cup Final win over Dundee at Dens Park in December 1980.
 Record Attendance:
 29,106 at Dens Park, 14 May 1983 (Premier Division)                                                                                                          
 21,325 at Tannadice, 3 January 1966 (old Division One)
 Lowest Attendance:
 9,185 at Tannadice, 12 December 1999 (SPL)                                                                        
 7,645 at Dens Park, 29 January 1994 (Premier Division)

Players at both clubs
 
16 players have signed for Dundee United directly from Dundee, with 10 making the opposite journey from Tannadice to Dens Park. Only players who have played at least one first team game for both clubs are currently included.

Dundee to Dundee United

Dundee United to Dundee

Complete list
In addition, other players have played for both clubs without moving directly between them. A list of all players to have played at least one first-team game for both clubs is displayed below.

 
 Scott Allan
 Stuart Beedie
 Kenny Cameron
 Aaron Conway
 Craig Curran
 Jimmy Dickson
 Paul Dixon
 Billy Dodds
 Neil Duffy
 Iain Ferguson
 Mark Fotheringham
 Jock Gilmour
 Alan Gordon
 James Grady
 Jim Hamilton
 John Holt
 Mark Kerr
 Billy Kirkwood
 Jim Lauchlan
 George Mackay
 Duncan MacLeod
 Lee Mair
 Collie Martin
 Roy McBain
 Tommy McDermott
 Kevin McDonald
 Jim McInally
 Stewart McKimmie
 Andy McLaren
 Gordon McLeod

 Paul McMullan
 John McQuillan
 James Angus Munro
 Simon Murray
 Stephen O'Donnell
 Kinnaird Ouchterlonie
 Iain Phillip
 Ian Redford
 Paul Ritchie
 Steven Robb
 Scott Robertson
 Bobby Robinson
 Jock Ross
 Craig Samson
 Ian Scott
 Rab Shannon
 Harry Smith
 Kevin Smith
 Alex Stuart
 Billy Thomson
 Lewis Toshney
 Gordon Wallace
 Lee Wilkie
 Billy Williamson

 Unknown
 Tim Dailly
 Thomas Flood
 Fred Stoessel

 
 Beto Naveda

 
 Ryan McGowan

 
 Bert Dainty
 Albert Juliussen

 
 Tommy Coyne
 David Worrell

 
 Danny Griffin

 
 Osman Sow

 Jack Court

 
 Dragutin Ristić

Goal scorer records

Full game list

Fixtures from 1925 to the present day featuring League games, Scottish Cup and League Cup matches. Friendlies, testimonials and other non-competitive games are not included.
Dundee wins are coloured in blue, United wins in tangerine and draws are grey. Note that United played in white until 1969 but tangerine is used throughout for ease.

References 

Scotland football derbies
Dundee F.C.
Dundee United F.C.
Football in Dundee
Recurring sporting events established in 1925